This is a list of Danish television related events from 1977.

Events

Debuts

Television shows

Ending this year

Births
6 April - Ditte Ylva Olsen, actress
25 April - Eva Harlou, TV host
29 May - Lene Beier, TV host
2 June - Signe Molde-Amelung, TV host
2 November - Thomas Voss, actor
16 November - Vicki Berlin, actress
2 December - David Owe, actor

Deaths

See also
1977 in Denmark